Hargeisa District is a district in the Maroodi Jeex region in Somaliland. Its capital lies at Hargeisa. Other settlements in the district include Daarbuduq.

See also
Administrative divisions of Somaliland
Regions of Somaliland
Districts of Somaliland

References

External links
 Administrative map of Hargeisa District

Districts of Somaliland
Maroodi Jeex